Automatic pronunciation assessment is the use of speech recognition to verify the correctness of pronounced speech, as distinguished from manual assessment by an instructor or proctor. Also called speech verification, the main application of this technology is computer-aided pronunciation teaching (CAPT) when combined with computer-aided instruction for computer-assisted language learning (CALL), speech remediation, or accent reduction. Pronunciation assessment does not determine unknown speech (as in dictation or automatic transcription) but instead, knowing the expected word(s) in advance, it attempts to verify the correctness of the learner's pronunciation and ideally their intelligibility to listeners, sometimes along with often inconsequential prosody such as intonation, pitch, tempo, rhythm, and stress. Pronunciation assessment is also used in reading tutoring, for example in products such as Microsoft Teams and from Amira Learning. Automatic pronunciation assessment can also be used to help diagnose and treat speech disorders such as apraxia.

The earliest work on pronunciation assessment avoided measuring genuine listener intelligibility, a shortcoming corrected in 2011 at the Toyohashi University of Technology, and included in the Versant high-stakes English fluency assessment from Pearson and mobile apps from 17zuoye Education & Technology, but still missing in 2023 products from Google Search, Microsoft, Educational Testing Service, Speechace, and ELSA. Assessing authentic listener intelligibility is essential for avoiding inaccuracies from accent bias, especially in high-stakes assessments; from words with multiple correct pronunciations; and from phoneme coding errors in machine-readable pronunciation dictionaries. In the Common European Framework of Reference for Languages (CEFR) assessment criteria for "overall phonological control", intelligibility outweighs formally correct pronunciation at all levels.

Although there are as yet no industry-standard benchmarks for evaluating pronunciation assessment accuracy, researchers occasionally release evaluation speech corpuses for others to use for improving assessment quality. Such evaluation databases often emphasize formally unaccented pronunciation to the exclusion of genuine intelligibility evident from blinded listener transcriptions. Some promising areas for improvement being developed in 2023 include articulatory feature extraction and transfer learning to suppress unnecessary corrections. Other interesting advances under development include "augmented reality" interfaces for mobile devices using optical character recognition to provide pronunciation training on text found in user environments.

See also 
 Phonetics
 Speech segmentation — often called "forced alignment" (of audio to its expected phonemes) in this context
 Statistical classification

References

External links 
 International Speech Communication Association (ISCA) Special Interest Group on Speech and Language Technologies in Education (SLaTE)

Educational technology
Language learning software
Natural language processing
Phonetics
Speech recognition
Statistical classification